The 1981 Campeonato Brasileiro Série A, (officially the 1981 Taça de Ouro) was the 25th edition of the Campeonato Brasileiro Série A.

Overview
It was performed by 44 teams, and Grêmio won the championship.
Teams were selected by record on previous state championship

Teams and locations

1 Entered directly on second phase.

First phase

Group A

Group B

Group C

Group D

Second phase

Group E

Group F

Group G

Group H

Group I

Group J

Group K

Group L

Round of 16

Quarterfinals

Semifinals

Finals

First leg

Second leg

Final standings

References

Sources
 1981 Campeonato Brasileiro Série A at RSSSF
 RSSSF Brasil

1981
1
Brazil
B